Črešnjevec pri Semiču is a small village east of Semič in southeastern Slovenia. The Municipality of Semič is part of the historical region of Lower Carniola. The municipality is now included in the Southeast Slovenia Statistical Region.

Name
The name of the settlement was changed from Črešnjevec to Črešnjevec pri Semiču in 1953.

References

External links
Črešnjevec pri Semiču at Geopedia

Populated places in the Municipality of Semič